, founded in April 1979 and incorporated in February 1984 in Tokyo, Japan, by Arakawa Toru and Kamada Tomihisa, is a company providing a variety of software for connected and mobile devices, such as mobile phones, PDAs, video game consoles and set top boxes.

The company makes the NetFront software series, which has been deployed in over 1 billion devices, representing over 2,000 models, as of the end of January 2011, and which has been used as a principal element of the widely successful i-mode data service of NTT DoCoMo in Japan. NetFront is also used by many consumer electronic devices beyond mobile phones, such as the Sony PSP and the Amazon Kindle, both of which have their web browsers powered by NetFront.  In addition, the NetFront Browser and related products are used on a wide variety of mobile phones, including those from Nokia, Samsung, LG Corp., Motorola, Sony Ericsson and others.

In September 2005, ACCESS acquired PalmSource, the owner of the Palm OS and BeOS. The company has used these assets and expertise to create the Access Linux Platform, an open-source Linux-based platform for smartphones and other mobile devices, with some proprietary parts including the user interface and some middleware. The Access Linux Platform 3.0 was released to the market in October 2008. Two of the world's largest operators, NTT DoCoMo and Orange, have announced support for Access Linux Platform-based handsets.

In March 2006, ACCESS acquired IP Infusion, Inc., a provider of intelligent networking software, providing Layer 2 and Layer 3 carrier-class switching and routing as well as a comprehensive forwarding plane implementation supporting L2, L3 (IPv4 & v6), multicast and MPLS/Traffic Engineering.

ACCESS is active in open source-related efforts, including memberships in the Linux Foundation and the Linux Phone Standards Forum. In 2007, ACCESS employees presented at GUADEC (which the company also sponsored) and the Ottawa Linux Symposium.

, ACCESS employs approximately 657 people globally, with headquarters in Tokyo, Japan and facilities in the USA (Sunnyvale), Germany (Oberhausen), Korea (Seoul), the PRC (Beijing) and Taiwan (Taipei).

The company reports consolidated revenues of ¥9.4 billion (for the fiscal year ending January 2020).

See also
 Qtopia
 Symbian OS
 Windows Mobile

References

External links 
 
 IP Infusion

Companies based in Tokyo
Companies listed on the Tokyo Stock Exchange
Software companies established in 1979
Software companies of Japan
Japanese companies established in 1979
Japanese brands